ATV (stylized as atv) is a Turkish free-to-air television network owned by Turkuvaz Media Group.
As of August 2013, ATV was Turkey's most popular channel with a market share of 22%.
ATV was founded by Sabah Group, who is the original owner of the channel. The channel changed its ownership to Ciner Media Group in 2002 and TMSF in 2007. ATV was owned by Çalık Holding's Turkuvaz Media Group, but in 2013, its ownership changed again to Kalyon Group.

Current shows

TV series 
 2007-2009: Elveda Rumeli
 2004-2009: Avrupa Yakası
 2012: Son Yaz Balkanlar 1912
 2018-2021: Beni Bırakma
 2018-2022: Bir Zamanlar Çukurova
 2019-2021: Hercai
 2019-: Kuruluş: Osman
 2021-: Kardeşlerim
 2021-: Destan
 2022-: Yalnız Kurt
 2022-: Bir Küçük Gün Işığı
 2022-: Aldatmak
 2022-: Ben Bu Cihana Sığmazam

Cinema 
 1993-: atv Yabancı Sinema Kuşağı

Quiz 
 2021-: Mutfak Bahane (Derya Taşbaşı)
 2011-: Kim Milyoner Olmak İster (Murat Yıldırım)

Life style 
 2008-: Müge Anlı ile Tatlı Sert
 2015-: Esra Erol'da (transferred from FOX)

Religious programs 
 2011-: Nihat Hatipoğlu Sorularınızı Cevaplıyor (Nihat Hatipoğlu) (transferred from Star TV)
 2012-: Nihat Hatipoğlu ile Dosta Doğru (Nihat Hatipoğlu) (transferred from Star TV)
 2013-: Nihat Hatipoğlu ile Kuran ve Sünnet (Nihat Hatipoğlu)

Magazine entertainment 
 2010-: Dizi TV (Didem Uğurlu)

News programming 
 1993-: atv Ana Haber (Cem Öğretir)
 1993-: Hafta Sonu atv Ana Haber (Nihan Günay)
 2015-: Gün Ortası (Deniz Türe) (transferred from Yeni Asır TV)
 2016-: Kahvaltı Haberleri (Nihan Günay)
 2016-: Son Durak (Melih Altınok)
 2016-: atv'de Hafta Sonu (İbrahim Sadri)

Sports 
 2011-: Turkish Cup
 2012-: Turkish Super Cup
 2020-: Bundesliga (via A Spor only)

Children 
 2016-: Minika Kuşağı

References

External links 
 Official website 
 ATV Turkey at LyngSat Address
 ATV Distribution

 
Television stations in Turkey
Television channels in North Macedonia
Television channels and stations established in 1993
Mass media in Istanbul
Eyüp